Bonnie Lucas (born 1950) is an artist, educator, and union activist.

Lucas is from Syracuse, New York. She attended Wellesley College, majoring in Art History, and earned a Master's degree in Fine Arts from Rutgers University. She is an adjunct professor at City College Art Education program. She also teaches in New York City public schools.

Lucas creates art focused on feminine themes: domesticity, identity, and childhood. She dismantles feminized objects and reassembles them to new configurations of art.

Exhibitions 
Her first gallery show was at the Avenue B Gallery in 1980s.

2011: Collages: Esopus Gallery

2014: 40 Year Retrospective: Sylvia Wald + Po Kim Gallery

2017: Young Lady: JTT showing works made between 1983-1987 - recognized by Time Out New York as one of the Top Five New York Art Shows

Personal 
Lucas lives in the Little Italy section of Manhattan. She has been in the same rent-controlled apartment that also doubles as her studio since 1979.

References 

1955 births
Living people
American women artists
Wellesley College alumni
People from Syracuse, New York
Rutgers University alumni
21st-century American women